Bristol Township School District is a public school district located in Levittown, Pennsylvania (U.S.). It covers Bristol Township in Bucks County. It has 5,971 students in grades PK, K-12 with a student-teacher ratio of 15.23 to 1. The district operates six schools (three elementary schools, two middle schools, one high school) covering grades from pre-kindergarten to 12th grade.

Schools 

Elementary schools
 Brookwood Elementary School, Levittown (914 students, 2021–22)
 Keystone Elementary School, Croydon (899 students, 2021–22)
 Mill Creek Elementary School, Levittown (1,015 students, 2021–22)

Middle schools
 Neil A. Armstrong Middle School, Fairless Hills (757 students, 2021–22)
 Franklin D. Roosevelt Middle School, Bristol (720 students, 2021–22)

High schools
 Harry S. Truman High School, Levittown (1,666 students, 2021–22)

Administration 

Bristol Township School District is governed under Pennsylvania law by a school board. The board is responsible for providing and maintaining a system of public education for residents within the district boundaries. The board hires a superintendent who is responsible for the day-to-day operation of the school system.

The superintendent is Michael Nitti.

Previous superintendents
 Ellen Budman (–2010)
 Sam Lee (2010–2015)
 Melanie Gehrens (2016–2022)

References

External links 
 
 Bristol Township School District report at US News & World Report

School districts in Bucks County, Pennsylvania